Ataga may refer to:

 Solomon Ataga (born 1948), Nigerian boxer
 Ataga Khan (died 1562), prominent figure in the court of the Mughal emperor Akbar